The Zăbrăuț is a right tributary of the river Siret in Romania. It discharges into the Siret near Pădureni.

References

Rivers of Romania
Rivers of Vrancea County